Michel Morin (born March 27, 1948) is a Canadian politician. He was a three-term member of the National Assembly of Quebec, a parliamentary assistant from 1999 to 2001, and whip of the Parti Québécois from 2001 to 2007.

Background

He was born on March 27, 1948 in Saint-Célestin, Centre-du-Québec and made career in education.  Before he ran for office, he was a political activist with the Progressive Conservative Party, the Bloc Québécois and the Parti Québécois.  He was the protégé of politician Louis Plamondon.

Political career

Morin successfully ran as the Parti Québécois candidate to the National Assembly of Quebec in the 1994 election in the district of Nicolet-Yamaska.  He was re-elected in the 1989 and 1994 elections.

In 1999, Morin was appointed parliamentary assistant, a position he held until 2001.  He also served as his party's House Whip from 2001 to 2007.

Morin did not run for re-election in the 2007 election.

Electoral record

Footnotes

1948 births
Living people
Parti Québécois MNAs
21st-century Canadian politicians